Jack Sullivan (30 September 1879 – 30 August 1957) was an  Australian rules footballer who played with Essendon in the Victorian Football League (VFL).

Notes

External links 
		

1879 births
1957 deaths
Australian rules footballers from Victoria (Australia)
Essendon Football Club players